Thermon Talmadge "Blackie"  Blacklidge (March 19, 1920 – July 6, 1972) was an American professional basketball player. He played for the Sheboygan Red Skins in the National Basketball League during the 1941–42 season and averaged 4.6 points per game. At Delta State University, he became the school's first ever men's basketball All-American.

References

1920 births
1972 deaths
American men's basketball players
Basketball players from Mississippi
Delta State Statesmen basketball players
Forwards (basketball)
Junior college men's basketball players in the United States
People from Jones County, Mississippi
Sheboygan Red Skins players